Tatenda Taibu (born 14 May 1983) is a former Zimbabwean cricketer who captained the Zimbabwe national cricket team. He is a wicket-keeper-batsman. From 6 May 2004 to 5 September 2019, he held the record for being the youngest test captain in history when he captained his team against Sri Lanka until Rashid Khan of Afghanistan claimed the record.

In July 2012 Taibu, aged only 29, decided to retire from cricket to focus on his work in church. In December 2018, it was reported that he was making a return to cricket. Later the same month, he played first-class cricket for Badureliya Sports Club in the 2018–19 Premier League Tournament in Sri Lanka.

International career
Taibu made his first-class cricket debut at the age of 16, and his debut for Zimbabwe national team in 2001, aged 18. In 2003, he was appointed vice-captain to Heath Streak on the team's tour of England, and he was appointed national captain in April 2004, making him the youngest Test captain in history then, until Rashid Khan of Afghanistan claimed the record in 2019. Rashid Khan was 8 days younger than Taibu when he captained Afghanishtan against Bangladesh.

He took a two-year break for Zimbabwe in from 2005 to 2007 when he played a season as the captain of Namibia and another season for the Cape Cobras in South Africa.

He made his return to the Zimbabwean side in a series against India A in July 2007, registering a century. The following month Zimbabwe hosted South Africa for a three-game ODI series and in the final game Taibu scored a career best 107 not out. It was the first ODI century by a Zimbabwean against South Africa.

During 2010 Taibu's form continued and he scored 73 against South Africa as Zimbabwe were all out for 268. The South Africans chased down the total comfortably with Hashim Amla and AB de Villiers scoring centuries.

He scored 98 for his side in ICC World Cup 2011 as their team won by 175 runs against Canada in Nagpur. Taibu played a splendid innings in must-win situation of World Cup.

When Zimbabwe returned to Test cricket in 2011, Taibu was selected to play in their one-off Tests against Bangladesh, Pakistan and New Zealand despite making critical remarks of the country's cricket administration. He scored half-centuries in each of the three Tests.

Taibu became the 5th Zimbabwean to score 3,000 runs during his innings of 53 (74) against Kenya at Eden Gardens, Kolkata during the 2011 World Cup on 20 March 2011. He along with Stuart Matsikenyeri set the record partnership in ODIs for the sixth wicket for Zimbabwe(188)

Retirement
On 10 July 2012, Taibu called time on his career aged 29. He said he would only do work for the church. Taibu told Zimeye: “I just feel that my true calling now lies in doing the Lord’s work, and although I am fortunate and proud to have played for my country, the time has come for me to put my entire focus on that part of my life.”

He scored 1,546 runs in Tests with 57 catches and five stumpings, while making 3,393 runs in ODIs with 114 catches and 33 stumpings. He finishes as Zimbabwe's fourth highest run-scorer in ODIs with the second most dismissals as a wicketkeeper, behind Andy Flower.

Beyond cricket
After his retirement Taibu moved to Liverpool, England. He joined Hightown St. Mary's Cricket Club in 2016 as a player-coach-development-officer in the second-division of the Liverpool & District Cricket Competition. While writing his autobiography he realised that he would have to return to Zimbabwe. In June 2016 he accepted a role as Zimbabwe Cricket's convener of selectors and development officer, with the encouragement of Peter Chingoka. Brendan Taylor and Kyle Jarvis left county deals in September 2017 to play again for Zimbabwe, fruit of Taibu's efforts to entice them back.

In 2019, Taibu wrote a book titled 'Keeper of Faith', in which he discusses socio-political situation in Zimbabwe, his childhood beatings, perception after witnessing privileged white cricketers and threats by receiving photos of dead bodies.

References

External links 

HowSTAT! statistical profile on Tatenda Taibu
Scorecard of one of Taibu's best games at Cricmania
News of Taibu's resignation at Cricinfo
Subsequent interview with Taibu at Cricinfo

1983 births
Living people
Alumni of Churchill School (Harare)
ACA African XI One Day International cricketers
Mashonaland cricketers
Zimbabwean ODI captains
Zimbabwe One Day International cricketers
Zimbabwe Test cricket captains
Zimbabwe Test cricketers
Zimbabwe Twenty20 International cricketers
Zimbabwean Under-19 ODI captains
Zimbabwean cricketers
Namibia cricketers
Kolkata Knight Riders cricketers
Cricketers at the 2003 Cricket World Cup
Cricketers at the 2007 Cricket World Cup
Cricketers at the 2011 Cricket World Cup
Badureliya Sports Club cricketers
Wicket-keepers